Broken Down...Live and Acoustic in the Poconos is an EP released by American band Tantric on July 22, 2008, on the Silent Majority Group label. The EP contains four tracks.

Track listing 
All lyrics by Hugo Ferreira, music composed by all members.

Personnel
Hugo Ferreira - vocals
Kevin Miller - drums
Joe Pessia - guitar
Erik Leonhardt - bass
Marcus Ratzenboeck - electric violin

External links
 Broken Down...Live and Acoustic in the Poconos at iTunes
 Broken Down...Live and Acoustic in the Poconos at Myspace

2008 EPs
Tantric (band) albums